Colombia–Russia relations are the bilateral and foreign relations between Colombia and Russia. Diplomatic relations between Colombia and the USSR were established for the first time on June 25, 1935 (then severed on May 3, 1948, and restored back to normal on January 19, 1968). Colombia has an embassy in Moscow and Russia has an embassy in Bogotá.

Recent

On October 3, 2008, Colombia, considered one of the closest U.S. allies in Latin America, sent its defense minister to Russia for the first time to discuss signing a new military cooperation accord. Defense minister (and future president) Juan Manuel Santos arrived in Russia on Oct. 6 to attend an Interpol police conference and meet with his Russian counterpart Anatoly Serdyukov, along with Colombia's Ambassador to Russia, Diego José Tobón Echeverri.

Alquin "is the first Colombian defense minister to make an official visit to Russia, which is of major significance for relations between the two countries", the Colombian presidency said on its web site. Talks focused on cooperation in fighting the drugs trade, terrorism and a new defense accord, it said.

Colombian Vice-President Francisco Santos said during a visit to Russia in June that his country wants to buy fighter and transport helicopters and radar systems as it broadens its sources of defense equipment. The defense minister will attend a demonstration of Russian weaponry during his week-long visit, the presidency in Bogota said.
Colombia's efforts to court Russia came after it voiced concerns about billions of dollars in Russian arms sales to neighboring Venezuela, where President Hugo Chávez proclaimed a goal of countering U.S. influence in Latin America and was accused by Colombia of arming FARC rebels.

On November 1, 2013, the Colombian Air Force intercepted two Tu-160s of the Russian Air Force that were flying over Colombian airspace without previous governmental clearance. The two blackjacks, as code named by the NATO, were escorted out of Colombian airspace soon after and a note of protest was sent by the Ministry of Foreign Affairs of Colombia to Moscow.

In December 2020, Juan Francisco Espinosa, head of Colombia’s migration agency said that two Russian diplomats were expelled after being accused of trying to obtain military intelligence and information about the energy industry and mineral commodities.

During the 2022 Russian invasion of Ukraine, Colombian president Iván Duque affirmed his support for Ukraine during a phone call with Ukrainian president Volodymyr Zelenskyy, condemning Russia's aggression by stating that, "Colombia has been firm with its voice condemning this opprobrium, it has done so in all multilateral instances and all diplomatic channels as the only NATO partner in Latin America and the Caribbean.“

See also

Foreign relations of Colombia
Foreign relations of Russia

References

External links
Colombian embassy in Moscow (in Spanish)
 Colombian Ministry of Foreign Affaires about relations with the Russian Federation (in Spanish)
Russian embassy in Bogotá (in Spanish)

 
Bilateral relations of Russia
Russia